Victor Ernest Schaefer (born March 2, 1961) is an American college basketball coach who is the head women's basketball coach of the University of Texas at Austin (Texas) Longhorns. He previously served as the head coach for Mississippi State, from 2012 to 2020, and for Sam Houston State, from 1990 to 1997.

Mississippi State
Schaefer was named the Bulldogs’ head coach on March 13, 2012, replacing Sharon Fanning-Otis who retired at the end of the 2012 season.  In his tenure at MSU Schaefer has led the Bulldogs to five NCAA tournaments, Four Sweet Sixteen appearances, 3 Elite 8 appearances, 2 Final Fours, and 2 National Runner-up finishes.  He also guided MSU to 2 SEC Championship and 1 SEC Tournament Championship, the only conference titles for MSU in any women's team sport.  The 2016-17 team made college basketball history by defeating No. 1 Connecticut 66-64 in overtime in the Final Four of the NCAA Tournament. That victory snapped the Huskies’ record 111-game win streak and sent the Bulldogs to the national championship game in their first Final Four appearance. The UConn win garnered MSU the 2017 ESPY for Best Upset and Morgan William a Best Play nomination for her winning bucket.

With a 74–68 win at Marquette on November 25, 2019, Schaefer earned his 200th victory as the head coach at Mississippi State.  It was just his 256th game at State, making him the second-fastest coach ever to achieve the milestone with an SEC program ahead of hall-of-fame coaches Joe Ciampi (258 games), Pat Summitt (259), Van Chancellor (263), Jim Foster (280) and Sue Gunter (280). Only Georgia's Andy Landers (251) reached the mark at a faster pace.

Texas 
Shortly after the COVID-19 pandemic prematurely ended the 2019–20 season, Schaefer left Mississippi State to fill the head coaching vacancy at Texas. The timing of the move was unfortunate, as it came shortly after he and his wife had completed a new house on an  farm near the Bulldogs' home of Starkville. Nonetheless, in June 2020, Schaefer told M.A. Voepel of ESPN,

Voepel added more detail to Schaefer's ties to the state, noting:

Head coaching record

†NCAA canceled all postseason activities for all college sports due to the COVID-19 pandemic.

References 

1961 births
Living people
American women's basketball coaches
Arkansas Razorbacks women's basketball coaches
Basketball coaches from Texas
Mississippi State Bulldogs women's basketball coaches
Sam Houston Bearkats women's basketball coaches
Texas Longhorns women's basketball coaches
Texas A&M Aggies women's basketball coaches
Texas A&M University alumni
Sportspeople from Austin, Texas
Sportspeople from Houston